Bilasur is a town of Toba Tek Singh District in the Punjab province of Pakistan. It is located at 31°3'0N 72°34'0E with an altitude of 162 metres (534 feet). Neighbouring settlements include Janiwala and Jaimal Singh.

References

Populated places in Toba Tek Singh District